CBSC may refer to:

 Canadian Broadcast Standards Council, a Canadian non-governmental organization
 City of Birmingham Symphony Chorus, a chorus based in Birmingham, England
 Comparator-Based Switched Capacitor, a type of circuit in electronics
 Cowboy Bebop: Space Cowboy, a popular online game